Elegu is a town in the Northern Region of Uganda. It sits across the international border  from the town of Nimule, South Sudan.

Location

Overview
Elegu was established in 2012. It sits across the Uganda-South Sudan border from the much larger city of Nimule. Before 2012, the customs and immigration functions on the Ugandan side were done in Bibia, to the south, along the Gulu–Nimule Road. The border crossing  was converted to a "One Stop Border Post", between 2015 and 2018. Construction was initially budgeted to cost US$7.1 million.

As November 2018, the border crossing was handling Ugandan exports valued at UShs225.2 billion (US$61 million) annually. South Sudan exports to Uganda at the same time were valued at USh1.2 billion (US$330,000) annually.

Population
In 2012, the population of Elegu was estimated at 5,000 people.

Points of interest
 offices of Elegu Town Council
 Elegu central market
 offices of the Uganda Revenue Authority, inside the OSBP
 offices of the Uganda Immigration Department
 Nimule National Park, to the east and north of the town.

One stop border post
Using US$5 million funding sourced from Trademark East Africa, the border crossing on the South Sudan side was under improvement to a one-stop border crossing (OSBP), as of May 2018. At that time, work on the Elegu (Uganda) side had been completed, but was awaiting completion of the work on the Nimule (South Sudan) side, in order to become functional. The funds were used to construct a customs and immigration building, a parking yard, an examination shed, access roads and drainage channels.

In November 2018, the OSBP on the Uganda side was officially commissioned by officials from Uganda and South Sudan. The facility was constructed at a cost of US$6.6 million, with funding from Trade Mark East Africa (TMEA), and others, including Department for International Development (DFID).

See also
 List of cities and towns in Uganda
 List of roads in Uganda

References

External links
 Planned Infrastructure Projects Between Uganda And South Sudan
Revenue Slumps At Uganda-South Sudan Border
 Draft Report On Border Procedures (78 Pages) As of December 2011.

Populated places in Northern Region, Uganda
Populated places established in 2012
2012 establishments in Uganda
Amuru District
Acholi sub-region
South Sudan–Uganda border crossings